The withers is a part of the back of a horse, dog or other quadruped.

Withers or Wither may also refer to

People
Withers (surname), several notable people
Withers A. Burress (1894–1977), American soldier
Wither (comics), fictional character in the Marvel Universe

Buildings
Withers Building, Winthrop University, South Carolina, USA
Withers-Maguire House, historic home in Ocoee, Florida, USA

Books
Wither (Passarella novel), a 1999 novel by Joseph Gangemi under the pseudonym "J.G. Passarella"
Wither (DeStefano novel), a 2011 novel by Lauren DeStefano

Other
Wither (EP), a 2009 EP by Dream Theater
Withers Stakes, American horse-race
Withers (law firm), founded 1896 in London, England
Wither (film), a 2012 film
Withers, West Virginia, a community in the United States
Withers, Western Australia, a suburb in Bunbury
 Wither, a mob and boss from the video game Minecraft